The following is a list of episodes for the British sitcom The Good Life that aired from 4 April 1975 to 10 June 1978, and starred Richard Briers (Tom Good), Felicity Kendal (Barbara Good), Penelope Keith (Margo Leadbetter) and Paul Eddington (Jerry Leadbetter). There were four series, each of seven episodes, and two specials. All thirty episodes are 30 minutes long.

Since the deaths of Paul Eddington and Richard Briers on 4 November 1995 and 17 February 2013 respectively, Penelope Keith and Felicity Kendal are the two surviving cast members.

Series overview

Regular episodes (1975–77)

Series 1 (1975)

Series 2 (1975–76)

Series 3 (1976)

Series 4 (1977)

Specials (1977–78)

Christmas Special (1977)

Royal Command Performance (1978)

References

 Richard Webber, A Celebration of The Good Life, Orion Books, 2000

Good Life episodes